David Wilhelm (born October 2, 1956) is a global renewable energy developer, currently working for Hecate Energy. Formerly, Wilhelm worked in the venture capital space and as a political campaign manager; most notably serving as Campaign Manager for the 1992 U.S. Presidential campaign of Bill Clinton, and later as Chairman of the Democratic National Committee.

He was raised in Athens, Ohio, and has started many transformational projects and funds in the area. Wilhelm later settled in Chicago, Illinois, and now resides in Columbus, Ohio.

He received his B.A. from Ohio University, as well as a Master of Public Policy from Harvard's John F. Kennedy School of Government. He has received honorary doctorates from Ohio University, the University of Charleston, and Wheeling Jesuit University.

Wilhelm has taught or served as a fellow at Harvard, the University of Chicago, Ohio University, DePaul University, and the University of Akron.

Early life
David Wilhelm was born on October 2, 1956, in Champaign, Illinois, to Hubert and Constance Wilhelm, who were undergraduates at the University of Illinois at that time. Wilhelm is a first-generation American; his father is a native of Krauschwitz, Germany, and was brought to the United States as a high school aged refugee of war-torn Germany by a Brethren Church farm family living near Auburn, Illinois (about 20 miles south of Springfield). 
 
Wilhelm's pre-school years consisted of brief family stays in Champaign, Illinois, Lafayette, Louisiana, and Baton Rouge, Louisiana, while his father completed a PhD in Geography at Louisiana State University. Two sisters, Diana and Suzanne, were added to the mix and, in 1963, the Wilhelm family, now totaling five, moved to Athens, Ohio, where Wilhelm's father had accepted an offer to join the faculty of Ohio University, a position he held until his retirement 35 years later.
 
Wilhelm took to political organizing and strategy at a young age. In sixth grade, he led his fellow Safety Patrol workers on a strike over an unnecessary twenty minutes they were forced to stay in their posts long after the last student departing school had crossed the street. When he was twelve, he would conduct surveys of college students to determine whether Eugene McCarthy or Robert F. Kennedy had greater support. When he was sixteen, he helped manage the successful campaign of his social studies teacher, Peter Lalich, for a seat on Athens City Council.

College years
Wilhelm attended Ohio University as a National Merit Scholar, graduating in August 1977, with a BA in Government. He was named the Outstanding Undergraduate in Government that year and was inducted into Phi Beta Kappa. While at Ohio University, Wilhelm continued political campaigning. At the age of 19, he was the first staffer hired by the then nascent Jimmy Carter presidential campaign in the State of Ohio. He was given the assignment of recruiting delegates and alternates in each of Ohio's congressional districts for the relatively unknown Georgia Governor. His work led to the filing of a complete slate of delegates and alternates, something that Carter's opponents failed, by and large, to match, providing the Carter campaign with a strong competitive advantage in Ohio.

In the fall of 1978, Wilhelm entered the two year Master of Public Policy program at Harvard University's Kennedy School of Government. During the following summer, he interned in the Office of Senator Howard Metzenbaum as an assistant to the senior legislative aide on budget and tax matters. During his time at the Kennedy School, he served as a teaching fellow for classes taught in public management by Professors Steven Kelman and Jonathan Brock.

Politics
Before moving to the private sector, Wilhelm ran political campaigns for candidates such as Bill Clinton, Joe Biden, and several Illinois-based Democrats, including Richard M. Daley and Paul Simon. He oversaw the day-to-day operations of the 1992 Clinton-Gore campaign, directed its Electoral College and political strategy, and planned the post-convention bus tour of the American heartland.

Upon his election in 1992, President Clinton nominated Wilhelm to serve as Chair of the Democratic National Committee, making Wilhelm the youngest person ever to serve in that role in either political party. As Chair, he re-established an advisory council of representatives from organized labor, and reached out to evangelical Christian voters, famously appearing before a convention of the Christian Coalition of America to a chorus of boos. Under Wilhelm's leadership, the DNC played a meaningful role in support of President Clinton's first budget proposal, which passed a Democratic-controlled House of Representatives by a single vote. But these organizational efforts were overshadowed by Clinton era controversies related to NAFTA, health care, and Congressional nervousness about the 1994 midterm elections.

Wilhelm served as Head of the Steering Committee for the City of Columbus' bid to host the 2016 Democratic National Convention, and is a lifetime superdelegate to the Democratic National Committee.

Economic development
In 1995, Wilhelm returned to Chicago to build a successful career in business  He and Kevin Conlon, a prominent labor lawyer and Democratic activist, started Wilhelm & Conlon Public Strategies (now Conlon Public Strategies) in 1998.  A year later, Wilhelm moved into impact investing, founding Woodland Venture Management, and starting two venture capital funds that invest in businesses in economically challenged parts of Central Appalachia and the Great Lakes region.

Wilhelm's second fund, Hopewell Ventures, focused on the Midwest. Their portfolio includes National Pasteurized Eggs, a Lansing, Illinois-based company that produces whole, in-shell, pasteurized eggs under the Davidson's Safest Choice Eggs brand.

Wilhelm is a founder of a newly created Ohio Appalachian Business Council and in 2010 served as co-chair of a successful statewide campaign in support of the Ohio Third Frontier. He is co-chair of the advisory council for the Voinovich School for Leadership and Public Affairs at Ohio University.

He is also the founding Partner of Empower Gas & Electric, a Columbus, Ohio-based energy services company designed to help communities capture the economic benefit of their spending on electricity through local generation projects and the deployment of energy efficiency strategies.

Wilhelm previously served as a senior consultant to the Federal Co-Chair of the Appalachian Regional Commission (ARC), Earl Gohl. This furthered Wilhelm's many efforts to promote entrepreneurship within the region and focuses on Appalachia's "Emerging Opportunities" for business growth and capital investment in energy, food, and health care as a pathway to a more diversified economy.

Hecate Energy
David Wilhelm is a partner and the Chief Strategy Officer at Hecate Energy, a leading American-based developer of renewable energy projects. Hecate Energy is actively pursuing large scale solar and wind projects internationally, including countries such as Jordan, Tanzania, Kenya, and Pakistan.

Wilhelm is leading Hecate's efforts on the African continent, which include projects both large and small, both on-grid and off-grid. Hecate is working in Tanzania to install 100 MWs worth of solar power on the campus of Tanzania's largest university, the University of Dodoma.

Hecate Energy is one of the charter members of President Obama's "Power Africa" initiative, which was launched during his recent visit to Africa. There, President Obama announced plans to double access to power in sub-Saharan Africa, where about two thirds of the population has no electricity.

Non-profit involvement
Wilhelm is Co-Chair of the Strategic Partners Group of the Voinovich School of Leadership and Public Affairs at Ohio University and a co-founder of its Center for Public and Social Innovation.

Early in his career, Wilhelm was the executive director of one of the nation's leading tax reform organizations, Citizens for Tax Justice, and was a co-author of studies that provided impetus for federal tax reform during President Reagan's presidency.

References

External links

1956 births
American campaign managers
American financiers
American political consultants
American venture capitalists
Democratic National Committee chairs
Harvard Kennedy School alumni
Living people
Ohio University alumni
People from Athens, Ohio
United States presidential advisors
People from Greater Columbus, Ohio